Peter Woite is a former Australian rules footballer who played with Port Adelaide and Glenelg in the SANFL. He is on the interchange bench in Port Adelaide's official 'Greatest Team' from 1870 to 2000.

Woite was a key position player, used at both centre half forward and centre half back. After an injury riddled debut season in 1969, Woite had a good year in 1970 which saw him earn interstate selection for South Australia, the first of 12 occasions where he would represent his state. He won the Magarey Medal in 1975 as well as Port Adelaide's best and fairest award and was a member of the club's 1977 premiership team. In 1979 he crossed to Glenelg where he played his last two seasons, bringing up his 200th SANFL game milestone after managing 182 games with Port Adelaide.

See also
 1977 SANFL Grand Final

References

External links

Year of birth missing (living people)
Living people
Port Adelaide Football Club (SANFL) players
Port Adelaide Football Club players (all competitions)
Glenelg Football Club players
Magarey Medal winners
Australian rules footballers from South Australia
South Australian Football Hall of Fame inductees